Angaz Rustai Shehidarhimi (also Romanized as Āngaz Rūstāī Shehīdarḥīmī; also known as Angūr, Angaz, Angowz, Angoz, and Angūz) is a village in Koregah-e Sharqi Rural District, in the Central District of Khorramabad County, Lorestan Province, Iran. At the 2006 census, its population was 387, in 63 families.

References 

Towns and villages in Khorramabad County